Danny Eslick (born 29 May 1986) is an American professional motorcycle racer. He currently competes in the MotoAmerica Superstock 1000 Championship aboard a BMW S1000RR.

Career
Born in Tulsa, Oklahoma, Eslick has competed for most of his career in the United States, where he won the AMA Pro Daytona Sportbike Championship in 2009 and 2011, the Harley-Davidson XR1200 Series in 2010 and the Daytona 200 race in 2014, 2015, 2017, and 2018.

He made his debut at international level when he competed in the 2013 Superbike World Championship round held in Laguna Seca as a wild card with Michael Jordan Motorsports.

He made his Grand Prix debut in the Moto2 class when he replaced the injured Efrén Vázquez in the 2016 French motorcycle Grand Prix, finishing the race in 25th place.

Career statistics

Superbike World Championship

Races by year
(key) (Races in bold indicate pole position) (Races in italics indicate fastest lap)

Grand Prix motorcycle racing

By season

Races by year
(key) (Races in bold indicate pole position) (Races in italics indicate fastest lap)

References

External links

1986 births
Living people
American motorcycle racers
Moto2 World Championship riders
Superbike World Championship riders